Nathaniel Alexander may refer to:

 Nathaniel Alexander (governor) (1756–1808), governor of the U.S. state of North Carolina, 1805–1807
 Nathaniel Alexander (bishop) (1760–1840), Anglican bishop in Ireland
 Nathaniel Alexander (MP) (1815–1853), Irish politician